Nowkan (also Romanized as Naukān) is a village in Abdan Rural District, in the Central District of Deyr County, Bushehr Province, Iran. At the 2006 census, its population was 30, in 6 families.

References 

Populated places in Deyr County